Clyde Township may refer to:

Canada
 Clyde Township, a geographic township in the municipality of Dysart et al, Ontario

United States
 Clyde Township, Allegan County, Michigan
 Clyde Township, St. Clair County, Michigan
 Clyde Township, Whiteside County, Illinois

Township name disambiguation pages